Bemetara district is a new district in the state of Chhattisgarh, India. 

The district was formally inaugurated by the Chief Minister, Raman Singh, on 13 January 2012. Shruti Singh, IAS became the first district collector. Bemetara has two administrative subdivisions, Bemetara and Saja.

The present collector of Bemetara is Vilas Sandeepan Bhoskar, IAS.

Demographics 

The district has a population of 795,759, of which 74,567 (9.37%) live in urban areas. Bemetara district has a sex ratio of 1001 females per 1000 males and a literacy rate of 70.58%. Scheduled Castes and Scheduled Tribes make up 18.10% and 4.67% of the population respectively.

According to the 2011 census, 97.43% of the population spoke Chhattisgarhi and 1.96% Hindi as their first language.

Administration

Blocks/Mandals 
Bemetara district consists of 5 Thasil (Taluk). The following are the list of the Thasil (Taluk) in Bemetara district:

Economy
The economy of Bemetara is based on agriculture. Almost 80% of the people in Bemetara work on their fields and farms. Another 10% are government employees in various departments viz: education, irrigation, PWD and FCIs. 10% peoples are involve in the business and real  estate & retail sector. The excise department of Bemetara collects around 5 crore of taxes.

Culture
Bemetrian culture is influenced with Chhattisgarhi ethics, rituals & customs. As with other Chhattisgarhi region, this region also organises Mandai, Panthi, Mela  on different occasions. Matar is conducted on the behalf of Bhai Dooj celebration which is the second day after Lakshmi Puja (Diwali), while Mandai and Mela are celebrated in Magh Purnima (February–March) season. Apart from Diwali, Holi and other Hindu festivals, regional festivals are also celebrated. These are Hareli, Pola, Tija, Deo Uthani Ekadashi, Kartic Poornima, etc.

References

 
Districts of Chhattisgarh
2012 establishments in Chhattisgarh